K-120 may refer to:
 K-120 (Kansas highway), a highway in Kansas
 K-120, a rating for hills indicating a construction point of 120
 K. 120, a Mozart movement